Look Out for Evans Bradshaw! is the debut album by American jazz pianist Evans Bradshaw featuring tracks recorded in 1958 for the Riverside label.

Reception

Allmusic awarded the album 3 stars.

Track listing
 "Georgia on My Mind" (Stuart Gorrell, Hoagy Carmichael) - 4:04
 "Hallelujah!" (Vincent Youmans, Leo Robin, Clifford Grey) - 5:37
 "The Prophet" (Evans Bradshaw) - 7:25
 "Love for Sale" (Cole Porter) - 4:26
 "Coolin’ the Blues" (Hampton Hawes) - 6:55
 "Blueinet" (Zoot Sims) - 7:35
 "Angel Eyes" (Earl Brent, Matt Dennis) - 4:58
 "Old Devil Moon" (Yip Harburg, Burton Lane) - 2:53

Personnel 
Evans Bradshaw - piano
George Joyner - bass
Philly Joe Jones - drums

References 

1958 debut albums
Evans Bradshaw albums
Albums produced by Orrin Keepnews
Riverside Records albums